Dhekal Chhoti is a village in Madhya Pradesh state of India.

References

Villages in Jhabua district